Assistant superintendent, or assistant superintendent of police (ASP), is a rank that was used by police forces in the British Empire and is still used in many police forces in the Commonwealth. It was usually the lowest rank that could be held by a European officer, most of whom joined the police at this rank. In the 20th century, it was in many territories opened to non-Europeans as well.

India

Assistant Superintendent of Police (ASP) is still in use in India where the officer holding this rank is from Indian Police Service. However, assistant superintendent of police is a probationary rank (till the second year of the career of an IPS officer) and is worn by officers when under training at SVPNPA. All IPS officers start their career as Assistant Superintendent of Police. State Cadre Officer cannot hold this rank. They hold Deputy Superintendent of Police rank which is equivalent to this rank.

The Bahamas
In the Royal Bahamas Police this rank is above inspector and below superintendent. An ASP wears three bath stars or pips on the shoulder.

Bangladesh

Assistant superintendents of police (ASP) are recruited through the competitive Bangladesh Civil Service (BCS) examination. They undergo a one-year-long training course at the Bangladesh Police Academy as probationary ASPs. After passing out from the academy, they undergo orientation training for six months at the district level as a probationer. After that they are appointed as fully-fledged ASPs in different units.

Nigeria
The Assistant Superintendent of Police in Nigeria is selected by the head of the Police Force in a state, The Commissioner of Police, to eligible candidates that must have achieved the Inspector of Police rank. The level is directly below the Deputy Superintendent of Police rank, and is the sixth-lowest rank, above the Inspector of Police; Major Sergeant; Sergeant; Corporal; and the Constable. A student who graduate from then prestigious Nigeria police academy (a Police officers academic and training academy ) is commissioned into the Nigerian Police Force as an Assistant Superintendent of Police

Pakistan
In Pakistan, an assistant superintendent of police is a selected through the Central Superior Services examination. An ASP is the entry level rank of the Police Service of Pakistan.

Sri Lanka
In the Sri Lanka Police Service, the rank of assistant superintendent of police (ASP) is a  senior gazetted officer in Sri Lanka police. The rank is above the rank of chief inspector of police (CIP) and below a superintendent of police (SP). Generally an ASP would be in command of a group of police stations in a police division. Direct entry to the rank is possible for graduates while chief inspector of police (CIP) would be promoted as well. They are similar to the Commissioned officers in Armed forces, Sri Lanka

Singapore

In the Singapore Police Force, ASP is the second lowest senior officer rank, immediately above an inspector and below a deputy superintendent of police. New police officer cadets holding university degrees graduate from the Home Team Academy as inspectors.

In the National Police Cadet Corps, the rank of acting assistant superintendent of police (A/ASP (NPCC)) is given to inspectors who have not attained the rank of ASP (NPCC) but have been appointed as the officer commanding of their unit. The rank insignia of assistant superintendent of police and acting assistant superintendent of police is the same, with both wearing the Singapore coat of arms, with the letters 'NPCC' below it to differentiate NPCC ranks from Singapore Police Force ones.

NPCC officers who hold the rank of assistant superintendent of police have a single row of silver braid on the peak of their cap (for males) or bowler hat (for females).

References

 https://web.archive.org/web/20091128044006/http://mahapolice.gov.in/mahapolice/jsp/temp/html/policerank.pdf
 https://web.archive.org/web/20090228121335/http://police.gov.bn/ASP.html

Police ranks
Police ranks of Pakistan
Police ranks of India
Police ranks of Sri Lanka